Minat al-Qal'a (اشدود; lit. "the harbour of the fort"), sometimes wrongly named Qal'at al-Mina, is a medieval coastal fort protecting the port known as Ashdod-Yam (lit. "Ashdod-on-the-Sea"), which was historically separate from Ashdod proper but whose archaeological remains are today located on the southern beach of the sprawling modern city of Ashdod. The fort has been built by the Umayyads and later restored and used again by the Crusaders.

History

Early Muslim period
The fort was built by the Umayyad Caliph Abd al-Malik ibn Marwan (reign 685–705 CE) before the end of the 7th century on top of Byzantine-era remains. It was in use during the 10th-11th centuries, and was restored and used again by the Crusaders in the late 12th century after sustaining serious damage from the 1033 earthquake.  Its medieval Arabic name was Mahuz Azdud, "harbour of Azdud", after centuries of being known as "Azotus paralios" (Greek for Ashdod-on-the-Sea) The fort was meant to protect the port from raids by the Byzantine navy, while the port itself was used by the same navy to exchange Muslim prisoners for ransom.

Crusader period
Archaeological excavations show that the fort was restored and reused during the Crusader period. They come to prove what was already known from documents from the era, which indicate that Nicolas de Beroard, a knight of lord Hugh of Ramla, was in charge of the  stronghold in 1169. From this period it is known as Castellum Beroart.

Ayyubid and Mamluk periods
The port stops being mentioned during the Ayyubid and Mamluk periods, making it likely that it was destroyed by the Muslims along with the other port cities from the coast of Palestine, due to fears that they might again be used by Crusader invasions from the sea.

Modern period
In 1863 Victor Guérin visited and described it, while in 1873-4, it was described by Charles Simon Clermont-Ganneau.
In 1882,  the Palestine Exploration Fund's Survey of Western Palestine described it as being apparently from "the Middle Ages".

The modern Arabic name, Minat al-Qal'a, means "The harbour (mina) with the fortress (qal'a)", while the modern Hebrew name, "Horbat Ashdod Yam", reflects both the current state of the fort and its ancient name: "ruins (horbat) of Ashdod-on-the-Sea".

Description
The almost rectangular fortress (35x55 meters) was enclosed by a six to seven meters high curtain wall. It has four solid corner towers, and two semicircular ones flanking each of the two huge gates that gave access to the strongholdto from the west and east.

See also 
Ashdod-Yam ("Ashdod on the Sea"), Ashdod's historic twin city, now part of modern Ashdod
Ashdod, the historic twin city of Ashdod on the Sea, today has largest Israeli port

Gallery

References

Bibliography

External links
Survey of Western Palestine, Map 16:  IAA, Wikimedia commons

Ashdod
Archaeological sites in Israel
Islamic architecture
Crusader castles
Castles in Israel

he:אשדוד ים#תאור המצודה